Caloptilia leucothoes is a moth of the family Gracillariidae. It is known from the islands of Hokkaidō, Honshū and Kyūshū in Japan, from the Russian Far East and from Korea.

The wingspan is 8.2–11 mm.

The larvae feed on Leucothoe grayana, Menziesia pentandra and Rhododendron species, including Rhododendron albrechti, Rhododendron dauricum, Rhododendron dilatatum and Rhododendron reticulatum. They mine the leaves of their host plant.

References

leucothoes
Moths of Asia
Moths described in 1982